Irma Karmol (April 13, 1923 – April 24, 1979) was a member of the Ohio House of Representatives. She was elected in November 1974, and died in office on April 24, 1979, in a car accident on her way to Columbus, Ohio, the state capitol.

References

External links
Profile on the Ohio Ladies Gallery website

1923 births
1979 deaths
Members of the Ohio House of Representatives
Women state legislators in Ohio
20th-century American politicians
20th-century American women politicians